ISO 31-9 gives name, symbol and definition for 51 quantities and units of atomic and nuclear physics. Where appropriate, conversion factors are also given. Annex A includes names of symbols of the chemical elements, Annex B the notation of symbols for chemical elements and nuclides, Annex C the original names and symbols for nuclides of radioactive series, Annex D examples of relations in different systems of equations using different systems of units.

00031-09